Bacoside A is a mixture of chemical compounds, known as bacosides, isolated from Bacopa monnieri.  Its major constituents include the saponins bacoside A3, bacopaside II, jujubogenin isomer of bacopasaponin C, and bacopasaponin C.  The mixture has been studied in in vitro experiments and animal models for its potential neuroprotectivity.

References 

Triterpene glycosides
Saponins